Clay County is a county located in the U.S. state of Iowa. As of the 2020 census, the population was 16,384. Its county seat is Spencer. Its name is in honor of Henry Clay Jr., a colonel who died in action in the Mexican–American War, and son of Henry Clay, famous American statesman from Kentucky.

Clay County comprises the Spencer, IA Micropolitan Statistical Area.

Clay County holds the annual Clay County Fair. The first newspaper in Clay County was the Peterson Patriot which started publication in 1880.

Geography 
Clay County is home to the large Barringer Slough wetland.

Major highways
  U.S. Highway 18
  U.S. Highway 71
  Iowa Highway 10

Airport
The Spencer Municipal Airport is located three miles (5 km) northwest of the business district of Spencer. It provides service to the county and surrounding communities.

Adjacent counties
 Dickinson County  (north)
 Palo Alto County  (east)
 Buena Vista County  (south)
 O'Brien County  (west)

Demographics

2020 census
There were 8,109 housing units of which 7,222 were occupied.

2010 census
There were 8,062 housing units, of which 7,282 were occupied.

2000 census

As of the census of 2000, there were 17,372 people, 7,259 households, and 4,776 families residing in the county. There were 7,828 housing units at an average density of 14 per square mile (5/km2). The racial makeup of the county was 98.08% White, 0.17% Black or African American, 0.10% Native American, 0.82% Asian, 0.03% Pacific Islander, 0.25% from other races, and 0.55% from two or more races.  1.13% of the population were Hispanic or Latino of any race.

There were 7,259 households, out of which 30.70% had children under the age of 18 living with them, 55.60% were married couples living together, 6.80% had a female householder with no husband present, and 34.20% were non-families. 29.80% of all households were made up of individuals, and 13.70% had someone living alone who was 65 years of age or older. The average household size was 2.35 and the average family size was 2.92.

In the county, the population was spread out, with 24.70% under the age of 18, 8.00% from 18 to 24, 26.90% from 25 to 44, 22.50% from 45 to 64, and 18.00% who were 65 years of age or older. The median age was 39 years. For every 100 females, there were 93.30 males. For every 100 females age 18 and over, there were 90.90 males.

The median income for a household in the county was $35,799, and the median income for a family was $42,769. Males had a median income of $30,163 versus $21,068 for females. The per capita income for the county was $19,451.  About 6.30% of families and 8.20% of the population were below the poverty line, including 11.10% of those under age 18 and 8.10% of those age 65 or over.

Economy
The county has been based on farming. The 1980s farm crisis caused some families to have to give up their farms, and farms have been merged to industrial scale. The population has declined since 1980. 

At one point Great Lakes Airlines was headquartered in Summit Township, Clay County.

Communities

Cities

 Dickens
 Everly
 Fostoria
 Gillett Grove
 Greenville
 Peterson
 Rossie
 Royal
 Spencer
 Webb

Townships
Clay County is divided into these townships:

 Clay
 Douglas
 Freeman
 Garfield
 Gillett Grove
 Herdland
 Lake
 Lincoln
 Logan
 Lone Tree
 Meadow
 Peterson
 Riverton
 Sioux
 Summit
 Waterford

Population ranking
The population ranking of the following table is based on the 2020 census of Clay County.
† county seat

Politics
For most of its history, Clay County has primarily voted for Republican party candidates in presidential elections. Exceptions to this include Bull Moose candidate & former president Theodore Roosevelt winning a majority in 1912, the longest Democratic streak in its history when Franklin D. Roosevelt & Harry S. Truman were on the ballot from 1932 to 1948, Lyndon B. Johnson winning in a landslide statewide & nationally in 1964, Michael Dukakis getting a huge boost statewide thank to the Midwest farm crisis in 1988, & Bill Clinton benefiting from Ross Perot gaining significant minorities of the county's vote in 1992 & 1996. The level of Republican support has increased significantly in recent years, with Hillary Clinton posting the worst performance since 1952 when Adlai Stevenson won an identical percentage of the county's votes at 26.1%.

See also

 National Register of Historic Places listings in Clay County, Iowa
 Clay County Courthouse (Iowa)

References

External links

 Clay website
 Clay County Sheriff
 Clay County Conservation website

 
1851 establishments in Iowa
Populated places established in 1851